Charles Deslys (1 March 1821 – 13 March 1885) was a 19th-century French writer.

He was educated at the Lycée Charlemagne then performed a study tour in Italy. Upon his return, he became an actor in the South of France and made his debut as a writer.

He began his artistic career in the theater. He traveled the south of France as a singer or an actor. Following the publication of a trifle in 1816 (Les Bottes vernies de Cendrillon), he discovered his literary talents.

He is buried at Père Lachaise Cemetery (71st division).

Works 

1847: La Mère Rainette, at Gallica
1849: Les Bottes vernies de Cendrillon, at Gallica
1850: La Marchande de plaisirs
1852: La Dernière Grisette
1852: Le Diable architecte
1852: Les Fiançailles des roses, opéra comique
1852: Flore et Zéphire, opéra comique
1852: Le Livre des devoirs
1852: Le Livre des dévotions de l'année ou l'Annuaire catholique
1852: Le Livre des femmes illustres
1852: Le Livre des fleurs
1852: Le Livre des saintes
1852: Le Livre du jardinage
1852: La Millionnaire ou Mademoiselle Carlier, P. Germain
1853: Mademoiselle Bouillabaisse, L. de Potter
1854: Le Jardin des plantes
1854: Rigobert le rapin, L. de Potter
1856: Heures de récréation at Gallica
1856: Pervenche
1857: Les Compagnons de minuit, Degorce-Cadot
1858:  Le Pont rouge, drama, at Gallica
1862: Un appartement à louer, vaudeville
1864: L'Héritage de Charlemagne, Hachette
1866: Le Roi d'Yvetot, Dameret
1866: Les Récits de la grève, Didier 
1867: Les Compères du roi, Dentu
1875: La Maison du bon Dieu, Sartorius
1875: Le Serment de Madeleine, Dentu
1867: Le Casseur de pierres, drama, Michel Levy

1821 births
Writers from Paris
19th-century French dramatists and playwrights
French fantasy writers
French historical novelists
19th-century French novelists
1885 deaths
Burials at Père Lachaise Cemetery